The 1969–70 Midland Football League season was the 70th in the history of the Midland Football League, a football competition in England.

Clubs
The league featured 17 clubs which competed in the previous season, along with one new club:
Worksop Town, relegated from the Northern Premier League

League table

References

External links

Midland Football League (1889)
M